Roopa Pai is  children's author and journalist living in Bangalore, India. She has over 20 published books which include the India's first fantasy-adventure series for children Taranauts and the national best seller The Gita for Children which also won the 2016 Crossword Award for children's writing.

Biography 
Roopa was born in a Lingayat family in Bangalore.

She started writing during her 11th standard, first writing articles for the Deccan Herald. She went on to complete her Engineering degree and moved to Delhi after her marriage. Here she started writing for the children's magazine Target. The couple eventually shifted to London where she wrote articles covering Indian restaurants in London, for the Travel Trends magazine. She was also commissioned by the British Tourism Authority to cover hotels and accommodations for Indian tourists across the UK. The couple eventually moved back to Bangalore.

Bibliography 
 2004 – Chanakya: The Master Statesman, published by Roopa Publications India
 2008 – Ticket Bengaluru, published by Stark World India
 2011 – The Quest For The Shyn Emeralds, book 1 of the Taranauts series published by Hachette India
 2011 – Riddle of the Lustr Sapphires, book 2 of the Taranauts series published by Hachette India
 2012 – The Secret of the Sparkl Amethysts, book 3 of the Taranauts series published by Hachette India 
 2012 – The Race for the Glo Rubies, book 4 of the Taranauts series published by Hachette India 
 2012 – The Mystery of the Syntilla Silvers, book 5 of the Taranauts series published by Hachette India 
 2012 – The Key to Shimr Citrines, book 6 of the Taranauts series published by Hachette India 
 2012 – The Search for the Glytr Turquoise, book 7 of the Taranauts series published by Hachette India 
 2013 – The Magic of the Dazl Corals, book 8 of the Taranauts series published by Hachette India 
 2014 – What if the Earth Stopped Spinning And 24 Other Mysteries published by Roopa Publications India
 2015 – The Gita for Children published by Hachette India
 2017 – So You Want to Know About Economics, published by Roopa Publications India
 2017 – Ready!: 99 Must-Have Skills for the World-Conquering Teenager (And Almost-Teenager), published by Hachette India
 2018 – Krishna Deva Raya: King of Kings, published by Eicher Goodearth
 2019 – The Vedas and Upanishads for Children, published by Hachette India
 2019 – From Leeches to Slug Glue: 25 Explosive Ideas that made (and are making) Modern Medicine, published by Penguin Random House India

Awards and recognition 
 2016 – Book titled The Gita for Children wins Crossword Award for children's writing
 2017 – Nominated for Femina 2017 women award in the category "Literary contribution"

References

External links

Roopa Pai at Rupa Publications

Book Review: The Gita for Children by Roopa Pai

Living people
Year of birth missing (living people)
21st-century Indian women writers
21st-century Indian writers
Kannada people
Journalists from Karnataka
Indian children's writers